Tuindorp Oostzaan is a neighbourhood of Amsterdam, Netherlands. The neighbourhood is named after the adjacent village Oostzaan. Approximately 20 minutes from Amsterdam Airport Schiphol. As of 6 August 2021, the neighbourhood had a population of 17,330.

History
Tuindorp Oostzaan was originally a working-class neighbourhood. It is one of the so-called 'garden villages' that was developed around 1919 between the First and Second World War as a counterbalance to the impoverished neighbourhoods in the city. Another reason for the neighbourhood of Tuindorp Oostzaan to arise was the need of housing of the growing group of workers from the new industry and shipyards on the north banks of the IJ.

Flooding

The levee breach on the night of 14 January 1960 made a deep impression. Within a few hours waters rose up to two metres high in Tuindorp Oostzaan and nearby neighbourhoods. Some people had to be evacuated by boats. "A coincidence," was the conclusion about the cause of the flooding. Probably caused by a burst water pipe. The total damage amounted to about eight million guilders (roughly three and a half million EUR) which at that time was a substantial amount. Reportedly, the compensation of the government was so generous that people joked: "Give us our daily bread, and if possible a flood."

Present-day
In 2021, the district had 17,330 inhabitants. Relatively speaking, there are many elderly people and families with children compared to all of Amsterdam-Noord. Single family homes are in the majority. The old, low-lying part of Tuindorp Oostzaan is mostly built in the twenties. The upper part is built in different periods of time and contains more modern houses, lofts, apartments and villas.

Present-day Tuindorp Oostzaan offers a mix of experimental festivals, picturesque country villages and restaurants. Close by you will find the NDSM terrain, a creative hotspot. On this former shipyard on the northern bank of the IJ grows a self-made city with hundreds of artists, creative businesses, sustainable business, unconventional homes, innovative culture and media, amazing cafes, hotels and restaurants and ground breaking events, on land and on water. NDSM is the new focal point for creative urban energy.

References

Amsterdam-Noord
Neighbourhoods of Amsterdam